The Market Harborough Building Society is a UK building society, which has its headquarters in Market Harborough, Leicestershire. It is a member of the Building Societies Association.

References

External links
Market Harborough Building Society
Building Societies Association
KPMG Building Societies Database 2008

Market Harborough
Building societies of England
Banks established in 1870
Companies based in Leicestershire